The 2020 NAIA Division I women's basketball tournament was the tournament scheduled to be held by the NAIA to determine the national champion of women's college basketball among its Division I members in the United States and Canada for the 2018–19 basketball season.

The NAIA cancelled the tournament due to the COVID-19 pandemic. It was the first time the tournament had to be cancelled since its establishment in 1981.

Due to the planned consolidation of the two NAIA divisions into a single division ahead of the 2021 tournament, this was also scheduled to be the final edition of a separate Division I NAIA women's tournament. 

The tournament was due to be played at the Rimrock Auto Arena at MetraPark in Billings, Montana.

Qualification

The tournament field was due to remain fixed at thirty-two teams, again utilizing a single-elimination format.

See also
2020 NAIA Division I men's basketball tournament
2020 NCAA Division I women's basketball tournament
2020 NCAA Division II women's basketball tournament
2020 NCAA Division III women's basketball tournament
2020 NAIA Division II women's basketball tournament

References

NAIA
NAIA Women's Basketball Championships
2020 in sports in Montana
NAIA Division I women's basketball tournament